The arrondissement of Ambert is an arrondissement of France in the Puy-de-Dôme department in the Auvergne-Rhône-Alpes region. It has 58 communes.

Composition

The communes of the arrondissement of Ambert, and their INSEE codes, are:

 Aix-la-Fayette (63002)
 Ambert (63003)
 Arlanc (63010)
 Auzelles (63023)
 Baffie (63027)
 Bertignat (63037)
 Beurières (63039)
 Brousse (63056)
 Le Brugeron (63057)
 Ceilloux (63065)
 Chambon-sur-Dolore (63076)
 Champétières (63081)
 La Chapelle-Agnon (63086)
 La Chaulme (63104)
 Chaumont-le-Bourg (63105)
 Condat-lès-Montboissier (63119)
 Cunlhat (63132)
 Domaize (63136)
 Doranges (63137)
 Dore-l'Église (63139)
 Échandelys (63142)
 Églisolles (63147)
 Fayet-Ronaye (63158)
 La Forie (63161)
 Fournols (63162)
 Grandrif (63173)
 Grandval (63174)
 Job (63179)
 Marat (63207)
 Marsac-en-Livradois (63211)
 Mayres (63218)
 Medeyrolles (63221)
 Le Monestier (63230)
 Novacelles (63256)
 Olliergues (63258)
 Saillant (63309)
 Saint-Alyre-d'Arlanc (63312)
 Saint-Amant-Roche-Savine (63314)
 Saint-Anthème (63319)
 Saint-Bonnet-le-Bourg (63323)
 Saint-Bonnet-le-Chastel (63324)
 Saint-Clément-de-Valorgue (63331)
 Sainte-Catherine (63328)
 Saint-Éloy-la-Glacière (63337)
 Saint-Ferréol-des-Côtes (63341)
 Saint-Germain-l'Herm (63353)
 Saint-Gervais-sous-Meymont (63355)
 Saint-Just (63371)
 Saint-Martin-des-Olmes (63374)
 Saint-Pierre-la-Bourlhonne (63384)
 Saint-Romain (63394)
 Saint-Sauveur-la-Sagne (63398)
 Sauvessanges (63412)
 Thiolières (63431)
 Tours-sur-Meymont (63434)
 Valcivières (63441)
 Vertolaye (63454)
 Viverols (63465)

History

The arrondissement of Ambert was created in 1800, disbanded in 1926 and restored in 1942. At the January 2017 reorganisation of the arrondissements of Puy-de-Dôme, it gained three communes from the arrondissement of Clermont-Ferrand.

As a result of the reorganisation of the cantons of France which came into effect in 2015, the borders of the cantons are no longer related to the borders of the arrondissements. The cantons of the arrondissement of Ambert were, as of January 2015:

 Ambert
 Arlanc
 Cunlhat
 Olliergues
 Saint-Amant-Roche-Savine
 Saint-Anthème
 Saint-Germain-l'Herm
 Viverols

References

Ambert